Deane Joseph Leonard (born November 20, 1999) is a Canadian professional gridiron football cornerback for the Los Angeles Chargers in the National Football League (NFL). He played college football at the University of Calgary before transferring to Ole Miss.

Professional career
Leonard was drafted in the seventh round (236th overall) in the 2022 NFL Draft by the Los Angeles Chargers. He was also previously drafted in the second round (18th overall) in the 2021 CFL Draft by the Hamilton Tiger-Cats.

References

External links
 Los Angeles Chargers bio
 Ole Miss Rebels bio
 Calgary Dinos bio

1999 births
Living people
Sportspeople from Calgary
Canadian players of American football
American football cornerbacks
Calgary Dinos football players
Ole Miss Rebels football players
Los Angeles Chargers players